Baghdad Gymnasium,, formerly Saddam Hussein Gymnasium, is a sports complex in Baghdad, Iraq adjacent to the Al-Shaab Stadium. Designed by Le Corbusier under the commission of King Faisal II in 1956 for potential use in the 1960 Summer Olympics. After Faisal II was overthrown in a military coup in 1958 the project went through several changes of design and location. The architect died in 1965, leaving a wealth of drawings and studies for the multi functions of Baghdad's Sports Complex that included a large stadium, tennis courts, swimming pools and a gymnasium. Only the later was finally built between 1978 and 1980, to be inaugurated by and named after Iraq's president Saddam Hussein. The American army troops occupied the Gymnasium as well as the Shaab district for some years following the Fall of Baghdad in 2003.

Architecture
The center is constructed of reinforced concrete. The main roof spans 34 metres and is constructed with a steel truss covered with corrugated aluminum sheets. The trusses are exposed in the interior and house the mechanical ducts. The indoor 3,000 seat stadium and the adjacent open-air amphitheater are linked by an enormous sliding door which, when opened, integrates the two stadia. In addition to organizing basketball, volleyball, tennis, table tennis, fencing, boxing, wrestling, weightlifting, Taekwondo, Judo, and gymnastics competitions and practices, the Gymnasium is host to concerts, meetings and rallies for political parties.

Publications featuring the Gymnasium
In January 1980, the Ministry of Housing and Constructions – State Commission for Buildings issued an Arabic publication celebrating the completion of the building. "Of the things we must take into consideration at this time is the importance of the Youth and of supporting them and the activities they take part in, and their economic, social, and political effects on the State's policy. Here is why such a gymnasium is an essential need for our youth: this gymnasium is one of the most essential outcomes of the Revolution, for Iraq's young people and for supporting and developing its sportsmanship. Of the most special characteristics of this gymnasium is its novelty in Iraq. Together with the Al-Shaab Stadium and the Olympic Pool, which will be built next to the Gymnasium, the complex will mark the beginning of a Sport Center. The State Commission for Buildings is proud to present this Gymnasium to our sportsmen. Finished in record time, the Gymnasium's utmost architectural distinction is considered a great example of the contemporary architectural arts in Iraq. We wish for our sportsmen's efforts to succeed, and here is an initiative that furthers our support and giving."

In 1981, Iraq dedicated a series of stamps to celebrate the inauguration of Saddam Hussein Gymnasium, among other modern buildings such as The Palace of Conferences and the Open Mind Arch at Baghdad University designed by Walter Gropius.
In 2013, an international conference co-organized by Ifpo's Urban Observatory (French Institute of the Near-East in Beirut) and Baghdad University, College of Engineering, under the patronage of UNESCO, was held in Baghdad with the title "The architecture of Modernity in Baghdad: from Le Corbusier to the Iraqi pioneers". It focused on the Baghdad's Gymnasium and included a visit of the building.

See also
 List of Le Corbusier buildings
 Frank Lloyd Wright's "Plan for a Greater Baghdad"

References

External links
 

Le Corbusier buildings
Buildings and structures in Baghdad
Sports venues in Iraq
Sport in Baghdad
Indoor arenas in Iraq
Volleyball venues in Iraq
Basketball venues in Iraq